Tingley may refer to:

Places
Tingley, West Yorkshire, England
Tingley, Iowa, United States
In Albuquerque, New Mexico, United States:
Tingley Beach, a recreational area
Tingley Coliseum, a multi-purpose arena
Tingley Field, a former baseball stadium

People
Clyde Tingley, governor of New Mexico
Katherine Tingley, Theosophist, founder of Lomaland
Leeann Tingley, American beauty pageant titleholder and Miss Rhode Island USA 2006 also Top 10 Miss USA 2006
Ron Tingley, Major League Baseball catcher
Stephen Tingley, Canadian stagecoach driver
Sue Tingley, Canadian field hockey player

See also
Tingler (surname)